Michelle Leonard (born 5 June 1973) is a German / British singer and songwriter, now based in Berlin. Leonard has written and co-written multiple songs, both singles and for albums, that have achieved gold and platinum status. Leonard is known internationally for her work with AURORA and Paul van Dyk, as well as for her collaboration with Robin Schulz (under the stage name Solamay). As a songwriter, Leonard is currently signed to Budde Music Publishing.

Biography
Leonard grew up in Germany, where she attended British schools. EMI Music Publishing signed her when she was 17. She had just released her first single at 16, which was a cover version of "Falling," a 1990 song by Julee Cruise that later became popular as the Twin Peaks theme song.

Leonard's first original songs included "Feel So Perfect," which was released by Cape, became a radio hit, and was used for a three-year, pan-European C&A advertising campaign. Multiple music videos and short films were created around the song. Many of her co-written songs have been used in advertisements for companies including Axe, RMS (Radio marketing services), Ford Ka and Vodafone Germany.

Some of Leonard's biggest songwriting hits have been performed by other artists. Her greatest achievements in this field have included AURORA's "Running with the Wolves," "Rooftop" by Nico Santos, and "Love Is You" by Thomas Godoj. In 2005, Leonard also worked on the song "Instant Replay" with Such a Surge, which was released on their album Alpha.

Leonard was also the performance and music director for the German Theatre Abroad project in New York and directed the musical "Electric Society," which was staged on 12 November 2005 in Cologne, Germany. In 2009, she was a judge on the German casting television show Popstars and released her debut album Fragile.

Since 2005, Leonard has been a lecturer at the Popakademie (University of Popular Music and Music Business), the Columbia College Chicago, and at the SRH Hochschule der populären Künste (College of Popular Arts) in Germany for Songwriting. In 2011, Leonard started the co-publishing company "DOLSIRA" with Universal Music Publishing, Germany, and in 2018, started "EERA" in cooperation with BMG Rights Management. In 2015, she started her own solo-artist project, Solamay, which has achieved platinum status.

Discography

As songwriter

As soloartist

Albums

Singles

References

External links
Michelle Leonard at Universal Music

1973 births
Living people
British songwriters
Place of birth missing (living people)
British expatriates in Germany